Richard Freer may refer to:

 Richard D. Freer (born 1953), American law academic
 Richard Lane Freer (died 1863), Archdeacon of Hereford